Ake v. Oklahoma, 470 U.S. 68 (1985), was a case in which the Supreme Court of the United States held that the Due Process Clause of the Fourteenth Amendment required the state to provide a psychiatric evaluation to be used on behalf of an indigent criminal defendant if he needed it.

Background 
Glen Burton Ake was arrested and charged with murdering a couple and wounding their two children in 1979. At his arraignment, his bizarre behavior prompted the judge to order a psychiatric competency evaluation. This resulted in a report by the examining psychiatrist that Ake was delusional, and specifically that Ake "claims to be the 'sword of vengeance' of the Lord and that he will sit at the left hand of God in heaven." Ake was diagnosed as a probable paranoid schizophrenic, and a prolonged psychiatric evaluation was recommended to determine whether Ake was competent to stand trial.

Ake was then confined to a state hospital for several months, before he came to trial. Ake's attorney requested that the court appoint a psychiatrist to perform an evaluation specifically for the purpose of helping to adequately prepare and present an insanity defense. The court denied the request, holding that Ake had no right to such assistance. Ake was then tried and convicted of two counts of murder, and sentenced to death.

Opinion of the Court 
The Court, in an opinion by Justice Marshall, framed the question as one of "[m]eaningful access to justice", weighing the individual interest in the accuracy of a criminal proceeding against the burden imposed on the state, in light of "the probable value of the psychiatric assistance sought, and the risk of error in the proceeding if such assistance is not offered".

The Court found that both the individual and the state had a strong interest, but that "the State's interest in prevailing at trial - unlike that of a private litigant - is necessarily tempered by its interest in the fair and accurate adjudication of criminal cases." Requiring the state to make one psychiatrist available to indigent defendants was not an excessive financial burden, and the state could not assert the desire to press a strategic advantage at trial.

The Court reversed the lower court's judgment and remanded the matter for a new trial.

Chief Justice Burger wrote a brief concurring opinion, writing for himself that "Nothing in the Court's opinion reaches noncapital cases." Before the opinions were finalized, Burger had tried to persuade Marshall to limit his opinion to capital cases, but failed.

Post-Opinion

After a retrial, Ake was convicted and received two life sentences. His accomplice, Steven Keith Hatch, was executed in 1996 for the slayings even though he had waited in a car outside the family's home. According to People magazine, Hatch was inside the house. Leslie Brooks, who was 12 years old, testified that he raped her. Then Ake shot the family or four, the two children survived having watched their parents die. Ake died at a prison hospital in Oklahoma on April 23, 2011.

References

External links 
 PsycLAW : Ake v. Oklahoma

United States criminal due process case law
United States Supreme Court cases
1985 in United States case law
United States Supreme Court cases of the Burger Court